Ptychadena chrysogaster is a species of frog in the family Ptychadenidae. It is found in eastern Democratic Republic of the Congo (Kivu), Burundi, Rwanda, and southwestern Uganda, with an isolated record from Serengeti, Tanzania. Common names yellow-bellied ridged frog, golden-bellied rocket frog, and Rwanda grassland frog have been coined for it.

It can also occur in disturbed habitats, including roadside ditches. Breeding takes place in streams. It is a common and adaptable species that is not facing major threats. Furthermore, it occurs in several national parks: Kibale and Bwindi National Parks in Uganda, and Serengeti National Park in Tanzania.

References

chrysogaster
Frogs of Africa
Amphibians of Burundi
Amphibians of the Democratic Republic of the Congo
Amphibians of Rwanda
Amphibians of Tanzania
Amphibians of Uganda
Taxa named by Raymond Laurent
Amphibians described in 1954
Taxonomy articles created by Polbot